Albert III (died 25 November 1199), also known as Albert the Rich, was Count of Habsburg and a progenitor of the royal House of Habsburg.

He was the son of Count Werner II of Habsburg, whom he succeeded in 1167. Albert married Ida, daughter of Count Rudolph of Pfullendorf and Elisabeth, daughter of Welf VI. Like his father, he was a loyal supporter of the Imperial House of Hohenstaufen.

He was the father of Count Rudolph II of Habsburg.

References

Counts of Habsburg
1199 deaths
Year of birth unknown